Lagam  is a village development committee in Surkhet District in the Bheri Zone of midwestern Nepal. At the 1991 Nepal census, it had a population of 3839 people in 647 households.

References

External links
UN map of the municipalities of Surkhet District

Populated places in Surkhet District